Radostów Dolny  is a village in the administrative district of Gmina Lubań, within Lubań County, Lower Silesian Voivodeship, in south-western Poland.

The village has a population of 240.

References

Villages in Lubań County